Mawlawi Zia ur Rahman Madani (born 1960) is an Afghan Taliban leader, former governor of the Logar Province and member of the negotiation team in the Qatar office.

Madani is of Tajik origin and belongs to Takhar Province of Afghanistan.

See also
 Abdul Salam Hanafi

References

1960 births
Living people
Taliban leaders
Taliban governors
Governors of Logar Province